The Yesvantpur–Puducherry Weekly Express is an Express train belonging to South Western Railway zone that runs between  and  in India. It is currently being operated with 16573/16574 train numbers on a weekly basis.

Service

The 16573/Yesvantpur–Puducherry Weekly Express has an average speed of 44 km/hr and covers 456 km in 10h 15m. The 16574/Puducherry–Yesvantpur Weekly Express has an average speed of 40 km/hr and covers 456 km in 11h 30m. Although it does not have a stop at Karmelaram or Heelalige, it is often stopped at these stations to allow the passage or arrival of 12677 KSR Bengaluru-Intercity Express, which sometimes experiences delays of up to forty minutes.

Route and halts 

The important halts of the train are:

Coach composition

The train has LHB rakes with a max speed of 110 kmph. The train consists of 24 coaches:

 2 AC II Tier
 3 AC III Tier
 12 Sleeper coaches
 1 Pantry car
 4 General Unreserved
 2 Seating cum Luggage Rake

Traction

Both trains are hauled by a Krishnarajapuram Loco Shed-based WDP-4 diesel locomotive from Bangalore to Puducherry and vice versa.

Rake sharing

The train shares its rake with 16505/16506 Gandhidham–Bangalore City Express, 16533/16534 Jodhpur–Bangalore City Express (via Guntakal), 16533/16534 Ajmer–Bangalore City Garib Nawaz Express and 16507/16508 Jodhpur–Bangalore City Express (via Hubballi).

Direction reversal

The train reverses its direction 2 times:

See also 

 Yesvantpur Junction railway station
 Puducherry railway station
 Gandhidham–Bangalore City Express
 Bhagat Ki Kothi−Bangalore City Express (via Guntakal)
 Ajmer–Bangalore City Garib Nawaz Express
 Bhagat Ki Kothi−Bangalore City Express (via Hubballi)

Notes

References

External links 

 16573/Yesvantpur-Puducherry Weekly Express India Rail Info
 16574/Puducherry-Yesvantpur Weekly Express India Rail Info

Transport in Puducherry
Transport in Bangalore
Express trains in India
Rail transport in Karnataka
Rail transport in Puducherry
Rail transport in Tamil Nadu
Railway services introduced in 2014